The participation criterion is a voting system criterion. Voting systems that fail the participation criterion are said to exhibit the no show paradox and allow a particularly unusual strategy of tactical voting: abstaining from an election can help a voter's preferred choice win. The criterion has been defined as follows:

 In a deterministic framework, the participation criterion says that the addition of a ballot, where candidate A is strictly preferred to candidate B, to an existing tally of votes should not change the winner from candidate A to candidate B.
 In a probabilistic framework, the participation criterion says that the addition of a ballot, where each candidate of the set X is strictly preferred to each other candidate, to an existing tally of votes should not reduce the probability that the winner is chosen from the set X.

Plurality voting, approval voting, range voting, and the Borda count all satisfy the participation criterion. All Condorcet methods, Bucklin voting, and IRV fail.

The participation criterion for voting systems is one example of a rational participation constraint for social choice mechanisms in general.

Quorum requirements 
The most common failure of the participation criterion is not in the use of particular voting systems, but in simple yes or no measures that place quorum requirements. A public referendum, for example, if it required majority approval and a certain number of voters to participate in order to pass, would fail the participation criterion, as a minority of voters preferring the "no" option could cause the measure to fail by simply not voting rather than voting no. In other words, the addition of a "no" vote may make the measure more likely to pass. A referendum that required a minimum number of yes votes (not counting no votes), by contrast, would pass the participation criterion.

Incompatibility with the Condorcet criterion 
Hervé Moulin showed in 1988 that whenever there are at least four candidates and at least 25 voters, no resolute (single-valued) Condorcet consistent voting rule satisfies the participation criterion. However, when there are at most three candidates, the minimax method (with some fixed tie-breaking) satisfies both the Condorcet and the participation criterion. Similarly, when there are four candidates and at most 11 voters, there is a voting rule that satisfies both criteria, but no such rule exists for four candidates and 12 voters. Similar incompatibilities have also been proven for set-valued voting rules.

Certain conditions that are weaker than the participation criterion are also incompatible with the Condorcet criterion. For example, weak positive involvement requires that adding a ballot in which candidate A is most-preferred does not change the winner away from A; similarly, weak negative involvement requires that adding a ballot in which A is least-preferred does not make A the winner if it was not the winner before. Both conditions are incompatible with the Condorcet criterion if one allows ballots to include ties. Another condition that is weaker than participation is half-way monotonicity, which requires that a voter cannot be better off by completely reversing their ballot. Again, half-way monotonicity is incompatible with the Condorcet criterion.

Examples

Copeland 

This example shows that Copeland's method violates the participation criterion. Assume four candidates A, B, C and D with 13 potential voters and the following preferences:

The three voters with preferences A > B > C > D are unconfident whether to participate in the election.

Voters not participating 
Assume the 3 voters would not show up at the polling place.

The preferences of the remaining 10 voters would be:

The results would be tabulated as follows:

Result: A can defeat two of the three opponents, whereas no other candidate wins against more than one opponent. Thus, A is elected Copeland winner.

Voters participating 
Now, consider the three unconfident voters decide to participate:

The results would be tabulated as follows:

Result: B is the Condorcet winner and thus, B is Copeland winner, too.

Conclusion 
By participating in the election the three voters supporting A would change A from winner to loser. Their first preferences were not sufficient to change the one pairwise defeat A suffers without their support. But, their second preferences for B turned both defeats B would have suffered into wins and made B Condorcet winner and thus, overcoming A.

Hence, Copeland fails the participation criterion.

Instant-runoff voting 

This example shows that instant-runoff voting violates the participation criterion. Assume three candidates A, B and C and 15 potential voters, two of them (in blue) unconfident whether to vote.

Voters not participating 
If they don't show up at the election the remaining voters would be:

The following outcome results:

Result: After A is eliminated first, B gets their votes and wins.

Voters participating 
If they participate in the election, the preferences list is:

The outcome changes as follows:

Result: Now, B is eliminated first and C gets their votes and wins.

Conclusion 
The additional votes for A were not sufficient for winning, but for descending to the second round, thereby eliminating the second preference of the voters. Thus, due to participating in the election, the voters changed the winner from their second preference to their strictly least preference.

Thus, instant-runoff voting fails the participation criterion.

Kemeny–Young method 

This example shows that the Kemeny–Young method violates the participation criterion. Assume four candidates A, B, C, D with 21 voters and the following preferences:

The three voters with preferences A > B > C > D are unconfident whether to participate in the election.

Voters not participating 
Assume the 3 voters would not show up at the polling place.

The preferences of the remaining 18 voters would be:

The Kemeny–Young method arranges the pairwise comparison counts in the following tally table:

Result: The ranking A > D > C > B has the highest ranking score of 67 (= 13 + 13 + 13 + 12 + 9 + 7); against e.g. 65 (=  13 + 13 + 13 + 11 + 9 + 6) of B > A > D > C. Thus, A is Kemeny-Young winner.

Voters participating 
Now, consider the 3 unconfident voters decide to participate:

The Kemeny–Young method arranges the pairwise comparison counts in the following tally table:

Result: The ranking B > A > D > C has the highest ranking score of 77 (= 16 + 16 + 13 + 12 + 11 + 9); against e.g. 76 (= 16 + 16 + 13 + 12 + 10 + 9) of A > D > C > B. Thus, B is Kemeny-Young winner.

Conclusion 
By participating in the election the three voters supporting A would change A from winner to loser. Their ballots support 3 of the 6 pairwise comparisons of the ranking A > D > C >B, but four pairwise comparisons of the ranking B > A > D > C, enough to overcome the first one.

Thus, Kemeny-Young fails the participation criterion.

Majority judgment 

This example shows that majority judgment violates the participation criterion. Assume two candidates A and B with 5 potential voters and the following ratings:

The two voters rating A "Excellent" are unconfident whether to participate in the election.

Voters not participating 
Assume the 2 voters would not show up at the polling place.

The ratings of the remaining 3 voters would be:

The sorted ratings would be as follows:

Result: A has the median rating of "Fair" and B has the median rating of "Poor". Thus, A is elected majority judgment winner.

Voters participating 
Now, consider the 2 unconfident voters decide to participate:

The sorted ratings would be as follows:

Result: A has the median rating of "Fair" and B has the median rating of "Good". Thus, B is the majority judgment winner.

Conclusion 
By participating in the election the two voters preferring A would change A from winner to loser. Their "Excellent" rating for A was not sufficient to change A's median rating since no other voter rated A higher than "Fair". But, their "Good" rating for B turned B's median rating to "Good", since another voter agreed with this rating.

Thus, majority judgment fails the participation criterion.

Minimax 

This example shows that the minimax method violates the participation criterion. Assume four candidates A, B, C, D with 18 potential voters and the following preferences:

Since all preferences are strict rankings (no equals are present), all three minimax methods (winning votes, margins and pairwise opposite) elect the same winners.

The two voters (in blue) with preferences A > B > C > D are unconfident whether to participate in the election.

Voters not participating 
Assume the two voters would not show up at the polling place.

The preferences of the remaining 16 voters would be:

The results would be tabulated as follows:

 [X] indicates voters who preferred the candidate listed in the column caption to the candidate listed in the row caption
 [Y] indicates voters who preferred the candidate listed in the row caption to the candidate listed in the column caption

Result: B has the closest biggest defeat. Thus, B is elected minimax winner.

Voters participating 
Now, consider the two unconfident voters decide to participate:

The results would be tabulated as follows:

Result: C has the closest biggest defeat. Thus, C is elected minimax winner.

Conclusion 
By participating in the election the two voters changed the winner from B to C whilst strictly preferring B to C. Their preferences of B over C and D does not advance B's minimax value since B's biggest defeat was against A. Also, their preferences of A and B over C does not degrade C's minimax value since C's biggest defeat was against D. Therefore, only the comparison "A > B" degrade B's value and the comparison "C > D" advanced C's value. This results in C overcoming B.

Thus, the minimax method fails the participation criterion.

Ranked pairs 

This example shows that the ranked pairs method violates the participation criterion. Assume four candidates A, B, C and D with 26 potential voters and the following preferences:

The four voters with preferences A > B > C > D are unconfident whether to participate in the election.

Voters not participating 
Assume the 4 voters do not show up at the polling place.

The preferences of the remaining 22 voters would be:

The results would be tabulated as follows:

The sorted list of victories would be:

Result: A > D, B > C and D > B are locked in (and the other three can't be locked in after that), so the full ranking is A > D > B > C. Thus, A is elected ranked pairs winner.

Voters participating 
Now, consider the 4 unconfident voters decide to participate:

The results would be tabulated as follows:

The sorted list of victories would be:

Result: A > D, B > C and C > D are locked in first. Now, D > B can't be locked in since it would create a cycle B > C > D > B. Finally, B > A and C > A are locked in. Hence, the full ranking is B > C > A > D. Thus, B is elected ranked pairs winner.

Conclusion 
By participating in the election the four voters supporting A would change A from winner to loser. The clear victory of D > B was essential for A's win in the first place. The additional votes diminished that victory and at the same time gave a boost to the victory of C > D, turning D > B into the weakest link of the cycle B > C > D > B. Since A had no other victories but the one over D and B had no other losses but the one over D, the elimination of D > B made it impossible for A to win.

Thus, the ranked pairs method fails the participation criterion.

Schulze method 

This example shows that the Schulze method violates the participation criterion. Assume four candidates A, B, C and D with 25 potential voters and the following preferences:

The two voters with preferences A > B > C > D are unconfident whether to participate in the election.

Voters not participating 
Assume the two voters would not show up at the polling place.

The preferences of the remaining 23 voters would be:

The pairwise preferences would be tabulated as follows:

Now, the strongest paths have to be identified, e.g. the path A > D > B is stronger than the direct path A > B (which is nullified, since it is a loss for A).

Result: The full ranking is A > D > C > B. Thus, A is elected Schulze winner.

Voters participating 
Now, consider the 2 unconfident voters decide to participate:

The pairwise preferences would be tabulated as follows:

Now, the strongest paths have to be identified, e.g. the path C > A > D is stronger than the direct path C > D.

Result: The full ranking is B > A > D > C. Thus, B is elected Schulze winner.

Conclusion 
By participating in the election the two voters supporting A changed the winner from A to B. In fact, the voters can turn the defeat in direct pairwise comparison of A against B into a victory. But in this example, the relation between A and B does not depend on the direct comparison, since the paths A > D > B and B > C > A are stronger. The additional voters diminish D > B, the weakest link of the A > D > B path, while giving a boost to B > C, the weakest link of the path B > C > A.

Thus, the Schulze method fails the participation criterion.

See also 
 Consistency criterion
 Voting system

References

Further reading
 Woodall, Douglas R, "Monotonicity and Single-Seat Election Rules" Voting matters, Issue 6, 1996

Electoral system criteria
Mechanism design